Elections to West Wiltshire District Council were held on 1 May 2003.  The whole council was up for election and the Liberal Democrats lost their majority, leaving the council with no overall control.

Many wards had boundary changes, and some were new. None were uncontested.

Results

|}

Ward results

Atworth and Whitley

Bradford-on-Avon North

Bradford-on-Avon South

Dilton Marsh

Ethandune

Holt

Manor Vale

Melksham North

Melksham Spa

Melksham Without

Melksham Woodrow

Mid Wylye Valley

Paxcroft

Shearwater

Southwick and Wingfield

Summerham

Trowbridge Adcroft

Trowbridge College

Trowbridge Drynham

Trowbridge John of Gaunt

Trowbridge Park

Warminster East

Warminster West

Westbury Ham

Westbury Laverton

References
Declaration of West Wiltshire District Council Election Results by Jeffrey Ligo, Returning Officer, published 2 May 2003 
election result at West Wiltshire DC web site

2003
2003 English local elections
2000s in Wiltshire